Annabel Arden (born 11 November 1959) is a British actress, theatre and opera director, and one of the co-founders of Théâtre de Complicite.

Early life and education
Arden was born in London in 1959 and studied English from 1978 to 1981 at Newnham College, Cambridge.

Career

Théâtre de Complicité
After university, she trained at Jacques Lecoq's theatre school in Paris with Monika Pagneux and Philippe Gaulier. She then toured internationally with Neil Bartlett. In 1983 Arden founded Théâtre de Complicité with Simon McBurney and Marcello Magni.

Opera
For Opera North, Arden has directed The Magic Flute, The Return of Ulysses, La Traviata and The Cunning Little Vixen. In addition, for the English National Opera, she has directed The Rake’s Progress. At Glyndebourne Festival Opera, she has directed Puccini’s Gianni Schicchi, Rachmaninov’s The Miserly Knight, Donizetti's L'elisir d'amore.and Rossini's The Barber of Seville.

Theatre
As well as acting and directing for Théâtre de Complicité, Arden has also worked with plays at the National Theatre, the Arcola, the Royal Court as well as for BBC Radio.

Personal life
Arden was married to playwright Stephen Jeffreys, until his death on 17 September 2018.

Awards
 Time Out Award 1987
 Olivier Award 1991
 Olivier Nomination The Rakes Progress 2002
 European Woman of Achievement Award in recognition of an outstanding contribution to pan-European understanding and progress that provides and inspiration to others 2003

Productions with Théâtre de Complicité 
 1983: Put It On Your Head (The Almeida Theatre, London) — as actress
 1985: A Minute Too Late (until 2005 all over Europe, in the USA, South Amerika, Israel and Sri Lanka) — co-director
 1986: Foodstuff — actress
 1986: Please, Please, Please — director and actress
 1987: Anything For A Quiet Life (The Almeida Theatre, London, and in 1989 as TV production for Channel 4) — actress
 1988: Burning Ambition
 1989: Dürrenmatt: The Visit (London, Zürich, Hong Kong, Australien) — director (with Simon McBurney)
 1989: The Phantom Violin — actress
 1992: The Street of Crocodiles, a both the life and work of writer Bruno Schulz (Royal National Theatre, thereafter on a worldwide tour) — actress
 1992: Shakespeare: The Winter's Tale (Seymour Theatre Centre Sydney, thereafter in Hong Kong and London) — director
 1994: The Three Lives of Lucie Cabrol (Manchester and thereafter tour til 1996) — collaboration
 1994: Out of a house walked a man … — collaboration
 1997: John Berger: To The Wedding (Radio production for BBC Radio 3) — speaker
 1999: Mnemonic
 2013: The Lionboy (Bristol Old Vic, thereafter on Tour) — director

References

Living people
British theatre directors
British opera directors
Female opera directors
1959 births
British stage actresses
People educated at St Paul's Girls' School
Alumni of Newnham College, Cambridge
L'École Internationale de Théâtre Jacques Lecoq alumni